Epacternis porphyraspis is a species of snout moth in the genus Epacternis. It was described by Edward Meyrick in 1933. It is found in the Democratic Republic of the Congo.

References

Moths described in 1933
Pyralinae